Chalcionellus is a genus of beetles belonging to the family Histeridae.

The genus was first described by Reichardt in 1932.

The species of this genus are found in Europe and Northern Africa.

Species:
 Chalcionellus decemstriatus (Rossi, 1792)

References

Histeridae